House with griffins is a two-storey mansion erected according to the order of B. Lazerev in 1894–1896, based on the project of the architect Iohann Wilhelmovich Edel, located at 20 Yusif Mammadaliyev Street, Baku.

History
This mansion, located on the Old Phone (now Yusif Mammadaliyev) Street, is believed to belong to the Lazarev family for the first time. After a while, the well-known merchant Akopov moved to this building and founded the ‘Münch und Weiss’ Trade Cooperation on the first floor of the building.
During the existence of the Democratic Republic of Azerbaijan, here was the Georgian diplomatic representation (at that time Georgia's Ambassador to Azerbaijan was N. Alshibay).

In Soviet times, many rich Baku residents lived here. Once, the House united into the main building of the nearby Institute of Theater, but after the demolition of the building, there was a great space here, and over time, this place turned into swamp.
After gaining independence, there was a Georgian embassy in the building, but for some reason the embassy was moved to another location.

Architectural features
The mansion-type house was built by architect Iohann Wilhelmovich Edel in 1894–1896. The building was generally adapted to the architectural structure of Yusif Mammadaliyev Street, but differs from surrounding buildings due to its classic forms, architectural elements. 
The top of the house was decorated with griffins and that's why it is called ‘House with Griffins’.

References

Griffins
Johann Edel buildings and structures